William Glenn Houston (born August 22, 1951) is a former American football wide receiver in the National Football League for the Dallas Cowboys. He played college football at Jackson State University.

Early years
Houston attended Central High School. He enrolled at Northwest Mississippi Community College, where he was a starting wide receiver from 1969 to 1970. He later transferred to Jackson State University.

At the time, he was part of a football program that had future NFL players Walter Payton, Eddie Payton, Robert Brazile, Jackie Slater, Emanuel Zanders, Roscoe Word and Don Reese. Houston was a starter at wide receiver.

Professional career

Dallas Cowboys
Houston was signed as an undrafted free agent by the Dallas Cowboys after the 1974 NFL Draft. He was a backup wide receiver behind Drew Pearson. He was waived on September 9, 1975.

Seattle Seahawks
On January 23, 1976, he was signed as a free agent by the expansion team Seattle Seahawks. He was released before the start of the season.

References

1951 births
Living people
People from Oxford, Mississippi
Players of American football from Mississippi
American football wide receivers
Northwest Mississippi Rangers football players
Jackson State Tigers football players
Dallas Cowboys players